Bishop Ábel Antal Szocska, O.S.B.M. (born 21 September 1972) is a Hungarian Greek Catholic hierarch. He is serving as the first Eparchial Bishop of the Hungarian Catholic Eparchy of Nyíregyháza from 31 October 2015 (until 7 April 2018 he was an Apostolic Administrator of the same Eparchy).

Biography
Born in Vynohradiv, Ukrainian SSR in 1972, he was ordained a priest on 30 September 2001 by Bishop Szilárd Keresztes. He was appointed the Apostolic Administrator by the Holy See on 31 October 2015.

See also

References 

1972 births
Living people
21st-century Eastern Catholic bishops
Hungarian Eastern Catholics
People from Vynohradiv
Hungarian people of Ukrainian descent
Order of Saint Basil the Great
Bishops of the Hungarian Greek Catholic Church